San Ignazio (until 2017, San Inazio) is a station on lines 1 and 2 of the Bilbao metro. It is located in the San Ignazio-Elorrieta neighbourhood, part of the Deusto district. The station is in close proximity to the San Ignazio Sports Center and the Elorrieta football field. It was opened on 11 November 1995.

Station layout 
San Ignazio is the only one of the underground stations in the metro to have three tracks and an island platform. The station is bigger due to it being the last of the shared section between lines 1 and 2 northbound, with each line splitting into a different tunnel after the station. Also, unlike the other underground stations within the city, it does not have the typical cavern-shaped layout. It was designed by Norman Foster.

Access 

  162 Lehendakari Agirre St. (Lekeitio exit, closed during night time services)
  167 Lehendakari Agirre St. (Benita Asas exit, closed during night time services)
  179  Lehendakari Agirre St. (Asturias exit)
  2 Levante Plaza (Levante exit)
   170 Lehendakari Agirre St. (Levante exit)

Services 
The station is served by line 1 from Etxebarri to Ibarbengoa and Plentzia, and by line 2 from Basauri to Kabiezes. The station is also served by local Bilbobus and regional Bizkaibus bus services.

References

External links
 

Line 1 (Bilbao metro) stations
Line 2 (Bilbao metro) stations
Buildings and structures in Bilbao
Railway stations in Spain opened in 1995
1995 establishments in the Basque Country (autonomous community)